Brunswick Half Tide Dock on the River Mersey, England, was a half tide dock and part of the Port of Liverpool. Situated near Brunswick Dock in the southern dock system, it only connected directly to the river.

The dock was built by Jesse Hartley, and opened around 1832.
Apart from the entrance channel, the dock has now been filled in.

References

Sources

External links
 
 Brunswick Half Tide Dock aerial photo

Liverpool docks